The 3rd Louis Vuitton Cup was held in San Diego, United States in 1992. The winner, Il Moro di Venezia, went on to challenge for the 1992 America's Cup.

The teams
Eight challengers from seven nations contested the 1992 Louis Vuitton Cup. Together they spent over $250 million. Il Moro di Venezia alone constructed four boats and spent over $85 million.

Il Moro di Venezia
The Italian challenge Il Moro Challenge was funded by Raul Gardini and skippered by American Paul Cayard. The primary designer was Germán Frers and the operations manager was Laurent Esquier. John Kolius was involved but could not sail as he had not completed his Italian eligibility requirements. Tommaso Chieffi was the tactician and Enrico Chieffi was the navigator. Other crew included Robert Hopkins and Steven Erickson.

Australian Challenge
From Sydney's Cruising Yacht Club of Australia, the Australian Challenge was skippered by Syd Fischer. Colin Beashel was the helmsman and Hugh Treharne the tactician.

Spirit of Australia
A second Australian challenge from Sydney, Spirit of Australia was headed by Iain Murray, skippered by Peter Gilmour and the team included Tom Schnackenberg.

Desafio Español Copa America
From Spain, ESP-22 was skippered by Pedro Campos Calvo-Sotelo and coached by Peter Lester. The crew included Antonio Gorostegui.

Le Defi Francais 95
Le Defi Francais 95 was skippered by Marc Pajot. Bertrand Pacé was the backup helmsman and navigator.

Nippon Challenge
The first entry from Japan, Nippon Challenge was skippered by Chris Dickson, who had fallen out with the New Zealand Challenge during the 1987 Louis Vuitton Cup. John Cutler was the tactician and the crew included Erle Williams and Mike Spanhake.

New Zealand Challenge
Michael Fay financed what would be his final New Zealand Challenge. Managed by Peter Blake, the team was skippered by Rod Davis and NZL 20's crew included tactician David Barnes, bow, Alan Smith; mid-bow, David Brooke; mast, Barry McKay; pit, Denis Kendall; floater, Mark Hauser; grinders, Andrew Taylor and Sean Clarkson; genoa trimmers, Kevin Shoebridge and Grant Loretz; mainsheet traveler, Don Cowie; mainsheet trimmer, Simon Daubney; and running backstays, Tony Rae and Peter Evans. Russell Coutts sailed the second boat and additional crew members included Chris Salthouse, Robbie Naismith, Ross Halcrow, Warwick Fleury, Matt Mason, Dean Phipps, Gavin Brady and Nick Heron.

Coutts and Brad Butterworth replaced Davis and Barnes during the Louis Vuitton Cup finals.

Swedish America's Cup Challenge
From the Stenungsbaden Yacht Club, the challenge was skippered by Gunnar Krantz.

Round robin

During RR1 a team scored 1 point per win.
During RR2 a team scored 4 points per win.
During RR3 a team scored 8 points per win.

Finals

Semi finals

Final

*Race removed from records after Il Moro di Venezia were successful in a protest over New Zealand's bowsprit.

References

External links
1992 America's Cup ultimatesail.com

1992
Louis Vuitton Cup
Sports competitions in San Diego
1992 in American sports
1992 America's Cup
International America's Cup Class